Summerly may refer to:
 Jeremy Summerly, a British conductor
 Summerly (horse), Thoroughbred racehorse
 Summerly, Derbyshire